Majjigudda is a village in Dharwad district of Karnataka, India.

Demographics 
As of the 2011 Census of India there were 196 households in Majjigudda and a total population of 991 consisting of 506 males and 485 females. There were 121 children ages 0-6.

References

Villages in Dharwad district